The Quinnipiac University Poll is a public opinion polling center based at Quinnipiac University in Hamden, Connecticut. It surveys public opinion in Connecticut, Florida, Georgia, Iowa, Minnesota, New York, New Jersey, Pennsylvania, Ohio, Texas, Virginia, and nationally. The poll is unaffiliated with any academic department at the school and is run by Quinnipiac's public relations department.  

Academic-affiliated polls like Quinnipiac have grown in significance as media organization polls have It has been described as media budgets have declined, and in 2018 Politico called the Quinnipiac poll "the most significant player among a number of schools that have established a national polling footprint." 

It is considerably larger than other academic polling centers, including the Franklin & Marshall College Poll, which only surveys Pennsylvania. The organization employs about 300 interviewers, generally drawing about a quarter of its employees from political science, communications, psychology, and sociology majors, and the remainder of interviewers from those not affiliated with the university. The poll has a full-time staff of ten.  The university does not disclose Quinnipiac University Poll's operating budget, and the poll does not accept clients or outside funding.

In 2007, Quinnipiac University Poll underwent construction of a new two-story building that was expected to double its available capacity to 160 calling cubicles. The purpose of the capacity expansion was to allow polling multiple states at once, rectifying a problem that arose during the 2006 Connecticut Senate election where other polls were canceled to support that poll.

The polling operation began informally in 1988 in conjunction with a marketing class.  It became formal in 1996 when the university hired a CBS News analyst to assess the data being gained.  It subsequently focused on the Northeastern states, gradually expanding during presidential elections to cover swing states as well.  The institute is funded by the university. Quinnipiac University is widely known for its poll; the publicity it has generated has been credited with increasing the university's enrollment.

The poll has been cited by major news outlets throughout North America and Europe, including The Washington Post, Fox News, USA Today, The New York Times, CNN, and Reuters. Quinnipiac University Poll receives national recognition for its independent surveys of residents throughout the United States. It conducts public opinion polls on politics and public policy as a public service as well as for academic research. Poll results are also aggregated by ABC News' FiveThirtyEight. Andrew S. Tanenbaum, the founder of the poll-analysis website Electoral-vote.com, compared major pollsters' performances in the 2010 midterm Senate elections and concluded that Quinnipiac was the most accurate, with a mean error of 2.0 percent.

Politico reported in 2018 that "much of Quinnipiac’s prominence in the field is also a result of its commitment to self-promotion." The publication pointed out that the poll "reports to the university’s public-affairs office, not any academic wing of the school," and that for many years the poll employed New York publicist Howard Rubenstein and prominent journalists to promote the poll.

See also 

 Suffolk University Political Research Center
 Monmouth University Polling Institute
 Siena Research Institute
 Marist Institute for Public Opinion

References

External links 

 Official website

Public opinion research companies in the United States
Quinnipiac University
1988 establishments in Connecticut